The 2001 European Open was a professional snooker tournament and the third of nine WPBSA ranking events in the 2001/2002 season, following the LG Cup and preceding the UK Championship. It was held from 23 November to 1 December 2001 at the Mediterranean Conference Centre in Valletta, Malta – the same place as the 1997 edition of the tournament. Stephen Hendry captured his 33rd ranking title by defeating Joe Perry 9–2 in the final. This was Hendry's third European Open title, equaling John Parrott as the most successful player in the history of the tournament. Perry reached his first ranking final, but he would have to wait another 13 years for a second which would come at the 2014 Wuxi Classic.

Tournament summary 

World Champion Ronnie O'Sullivan was the number 1 seed. The remaining places were allocated to players based on the world rankings.

Main draw 
Players in bold denote match winners.

Final

Century breaks

References 

2001
European Open
European Open
European Open
European Open
Snooker in Malta